A list of films produced by the Bollywood film industry based in Mumbai in 1968:

Top-Grossing Films
The top ten grossing films at the Indian Box Office in 1968:

A-C

D-H

I-L

M-R

S-Z

References

External links

1968
Bollywood
Films, Bollywood